Swedish–Turkish relations are foreign relations between Sweden and Turkey. Both countries are full members of  the Council of Europe, the Organisation for Economic Co-operation and Development (OECD), the Organization for Security and Co-operation in Europe (OSCE) and the Union for the Mediterranean.

Sweden has an embassy in Ankara and a consulate–general in Istanbul. Turkey has an embassy in Stockholm.

History

At the beginning of 18th Century, the two countries were allied against the Tsardom of Russia during the Great Northern War. Swedish King Charles XII, after his defeat in the Battle of Poltava, took refuge in the Ottoman Empire in the city of Bender.  Charles was welcomed by Ottomans and corresponded with Gülnuş Sultan, the mother of Sultan Ahmed III, who took an interest in his cause. His expenses were covered by the Ottoman State budget, as part of the fixed assets (Demirbaş in Turkish), hence his nickname Demirbaş Şarl (Fixed Asset Charles) in Turkey. 

Sweden has had diplomatic relations with Turkey since the 1730s. Sweden has been present in Istanbul at the same place as today since 1757. Sweden opened an embassy in Ankara in October 1934.

In October 1934, Crown Prince Gustaf Adolf, Louise and Princess Ingrid visited Turkey. On 2 October they arrived in Istanbul where President Mustafa Kemal Atatürk's salon car was waiting. The journey continued to Ankara where they were received by Atatürk, Foreign Minister Tevfik Rüştü Aras, members of the government and administration. The visit to Ankara lasted between 3 and 5 October. On 5 October a two-day visit to Bursa was made. The stay in Turkey ended with a four-day stay incognito in Istanbul, during which several receptions were held at the Swedish legation. On 10 October, the royal travelers continued with the Svenska Orient Linien's motor ship Vasaland, which arrived in Smyrna on the 12 October. From here, the departure took place on 15 October with the president's own train and on the 17 October arrival in Aleppo.

The Swedish Research Institute in Istanbul (SFII) was founded in 1962 and works to promote Swedish and Nordic research in and around Turkey, the Far East and Central Asia, primarily in the humanities and social sciences. Business Sweden has been active in Turkey since 1991 with offices in Istanbul.

When Sweden took over the rotating presidency of the Presidency of the Council of the European Union in 2009, the then Swedish prime minister Fredrik Reinfeldt announced his support of Turkey's European Union membership. Sweden's Green Party has criticized France and Germany's opposition to Turkey's membership.
Sweden stopped selling weapons to Turkey in 2019 due to Turkey's military operation in Syria.
In October 2021, in the wake of the appeal for the release of Turkish activist Osman Kavala signed by 10 western countries, Turkish president Recep Tayyip Erdoğan ordered his foreign minister to declare the Swedish ambassador persona non grata, alongside the other 9 ambassadors. However, the ambassadors did not receive any formal notice to leave the country and Erdoğan eventually stepped back.

Events in 2020  
In 2020, Former Swedish Foreign Minister Ann Linde called for Turkey to withdraw from Syria as part of her visit to Turkey, and Turkish Foreign Minister Mevlüt Çavuşoğlu reacted harshly to his Swedish counterpart.

Swedish NATO bid  

In 2022, Turkey opposed Sweden and Finland's bid to join NATO, on the grounds that the countries "host terrorist organisations which act against Turkey", including the PKK, PYD, YPG and Gülen movement. While the PKK is recognised as a terrorist organisation in both Sweden and Turkey, the Gülen movement is not recognised as a terrorist organisation in Sweden. In May 2022, Turkey quickly blocked the Swedish NATO membership application from being processed at an accelerated pace. 
In May 2022, Turkey vetoed Sweden's NATO membership.
On 28 June, during a NATO summit in Madrid, Turkey agreed to support the membership bids of Finland and Sweden. 
The Turkish government has since requested the extradition of members of the Gülen movement and the PKK from Finland and Sweden; that the countries stop supporting the Gülen movement, the PKK, and terrorism; and that Finland and Sweden should address Turkish security concerns.
Turkey demanded that Sweden end its support to the Gülen movement and the PKK.
Tensions between Sweden and Turkey were sharply heightened following protests against Turkey in Stockholm. Turkey summoned Sweden’s ambassador to answer for a video posted by the Swedish Solidarity Committee for Rojava that depicted an Erdoğan effigy swinging by his legs from a rope. The group compared Erdoğan to Benito Mussolini, who was hung upside down after his death. On the same day, President of the Turkish Grand National Assembly Mustafa Şentop cancelled the Swedish Parliament Speaker Andreas Norlén's visit to Turkey.  On 21 January 2023, leader of the far-right Danish political party Stram Kurs, Rasmus Paludan was permitted to burn a Quran outside the Turkish embassy in Stockholm. See below for further details. Following the incident, Turkey cancelled a planned visit of the Swedish defence minister Pål Jonson to Ankara.

Following the Quran burning incident, the Yeni Akit newspaper called for a boycott of Swedish companies such as H&M and IKEA.

Diyanet controlled mosques in Sweden 

According to Swedish paper Dagens Nyheter in 2017, nine mosques in Sweden have imams sent and paid for by the Turkish Directorate of Religious Affairs (Diyanet). Along with their religious duties, the imams are also tasked with reporting on critics of the Turkish government. According to Dagens Nyheter, propaganda for president Erdogan is openly presented in the mosques.

Armenian genocide dispute

On 12 June 2008, the Riksdag refused to refer to the 1915 events of the Armenian genocide as actual genocide. However, on 11 March 2010, the Riksdag eventually voted for a resolution recognizing the Armenian genocide.

There was a majority of one vote, with a total of 131 in favour, 130 against, and 88 absent. Turkey promptly recalled its ambassador to Sweden and cancelled talks that were intended to happen between the two countries on March 17, 2010.

Turkish Prime Minister Recep Tayyip Erdoğan responded by issuing a statement saying "We strongly condemn this resolution, which is made for political calculations. It does not correspond to the close friendship of our two nations". Turkey's ambassador to Sweden Zergun Koruturk said on Aktuellt that there would be "drastic effects" of a long-term nature on relations between the two countries, saying "I am very disappointed. Unfortunately, parliamentarians were thinking that they were rather historians than parliamentarians, and it's very, very unfortunate". Swedish Foreign Minister Carl Bildt blogged from Copenhagen that he "regretted" the outcome of the vote.

Free speech dispute
In January 2023, a consultant of the nationalist Sweden Democrat party applied for a police permission to organize a demonstration outside the Turkish Embassy in Stockholm, with the alleged intent to burn the Turkish flag, in an attempt to sabotage the Swedish NATO application and to protest against Erdogan. However, during the demonstration on the 21 of January, a Danish-Swedish right-wing extremist burned a Quran instead. The Swedish Police did not deny the permit as there is no law against blasphemy in Sweden, and no explicit prohibition against burning the flag of any country, but a strong protection of freedom of speech in the constitution. During the 2022 Sweden riots, the police only occasionally denied Quran burnings that posed severe risk of disorderly conduct, when the applications were late. Muslims have interpreted the Quran desecrations in Europe as motived by islamophobia (i.e. fear and hate) rather than as taking a stand for free speech. Laws against incitement to ethnic hatred, including anti-Semitism and hate crimes with Islamophobic motive, do exist in Sweden. However, prosecutors believe that burning a holy book would not be considered illegal and have therefor not tested the matter in court. 

The Swedish government were not allowed to decide on the demonstration, as they are forbidden to tell the police or other authorities/government agencies how to interpret the law and act in a specific case due to the constitutional prohibition of ministerial rule in Sweden. After the incident, the Swedish prime minister apologized and expressed his sympathies to Muslims worldwide. Despite the apology, Turkish President Erdogan said that Sweden can rely on "terrorists" and "extremists" to protect it instead of a strong NATO ally who happens to be proud and defensive of its Islamic values. The Sweden Democrat party continued to hire the consultant despite his initiative.

Permission for another Quran burning outside the Turkish embassy in Stockholm was denied in 8 February 2023, by the Swedish police in dialogue with the Swedish Security Service.

NATO 
While Turkey became a member of NATO in 1952. Sweden has never been a member of NATO.

See also
 Foreign relations of Sweden
 Foreign relations of Turkey 
 Armenian genocide denial
  
 Turkey–European Union relations 
 Sweden–NATO relations 
 Islam in Sweden
 Turks in Sweden
 Turks in Europe
 Nuance Party (a Turkey-friendly Swedish political party)
 Finland–Turkey relations
  
 
 Human rights in Sweden 
 Human rights in Turkey
 European Union–NATO relations

Notes

References

External links
 Turkish Ministry of Foreign Affairs about relations with Sweden
 Turkish embassies in Sweden
 Swedish embassy in Ankara

 
Turkey
Bilateral relations of Turkey